Llanilar railway station was on the Carmarthen to Aberystwyth Line (originally called the Manchester and Milford Railway before being transferred to the Great Western Railway).

History
The station opened in August 1867 to serve the nearby village. The station closed in December 1964 when services were truncated at Strata Florida, following flood damage by the River Ystwyth to the line one mile east of Llanilar. Formal closure was confirmed two months later. In 2017, both platforms survive, together with some of the original spear fencing.  The station had a signal box set back from the platform, and a combined waiting room and ticket office. The goods yard had a weighbridge and several sidings.

References
Notes

Sources

Further reading
 Holden, J.S. (1979, revised 2nd edition 2007): The Manchester & Milford Railway, Oakwood Press,

External links
 Video of the station
 The old platform at Llanilar
 Llanilar Station site

Disused railway stations in Ceredigion
Former Great Western Railway stations
Beeching closures in Wales
Railway stations in Great Britain opened in 1867
Railway stations in Great Britain closed in 1964